This page lists the genera in the family Carabidae.

Basal ground beetles

Carabinae 
 Altagonum
 Aplothorax
 Calosoma
 Carabus
 Cychrus
 Homothes
 Fortagonum
 Laemostenus
 Notagonum

Cicindelinae 

 Abroscelis
 Amblycheila
 Aniara
 Antennaria
 Apteroessa
 Archidela
 Baloghiella
 Bennigsenium
 Brasiella
 Caledonica
 Caledonomorpha
 Callidema
 Callytron
 Calomera
 Calyptoglossa
 Cenothyla
 Cephalota
 Chaetodera
 Cheilonycha
 Cheiloxya
 Cicindela
 Collyris
 Cratohaerea
 †Cretotetracha
 Ctenostoma
 Cylindera
 Darlingtonica
 Derocrania
 Diastrophella
 Dilatotarsa
 Distipsidera
 Dromica
 Dromicoida
 Dromochorus
 Ellipsoptera
 Enantiola
 Eunota
 Euprosopus
 Euryarthron
 Eurymorpha
 Euzona
 Grammognatha
 Grandopronotalia
 Guineica
 Habrodera
 Habroscelimorpha
 Heptodonta
 Hypaetha
 Iresia
 Jansenia
 Langea
 Leptognatha
 Lophyra
 Macfarlandia
 Manautea
 Mantica
 Manticora
 Megacephala
 Megalomma
 Metriocheila
 Micromentignatha
 Microthylax
 Myriochila
 Naviauxella
 Neochila
 Neocicindela
 Neocollyris
 Neolaphyra
 Nickerlea
 Notospira
 Odontocheila
 Omus
 Opilidia
 Opisthencentrus
 Orthocindela
 Oxycheila
 †Oxycheilopsis
 Oxygonia
 Oxygoniola
 Paraphysodeutera
 Pentacomia
 Peridexia
 Phaeoxantha
 Phyllodroma
 Physodeutera
 Picnochile
 Platychile
 Pogonostoma
 Polyrhanis
 Pometon
 Prepusa
 Probstia
 Pronyssa
 Pronyssiformia
 Prothyma
 Prothymidia
 Protocollyris
 Pseudotetracha
 Pseudoxycheila
 Rhysopleura
 Rhytidophaena
 Rivacindela
 Ronhuberia
 Salpingophora
 Socotrana
 Stenocosmia
 Sumlinia
 Tetracha
 Therates
 Thopeutica
 Tricondyla
 Vata
 Waltherhornia

Ctenodactylinae 

 Alachnothorax
 Amblycoleus
 Antipionycha
 Asakalaphium
 Ctenodactyla
 Dinopelma
 Hexagonia
 Leptotrachelon
 Leptotrachelus
 Oilea
 Omphreoides
 Parapionycha
 Pionycha
 Plagiotelum
 Propionycha
 Pseudometabletus
 Schidonychus
 Teukrus
 Wate

Elaphrinae 
 Blethisa
 Diacheila
 Elaphrus

Hiletinae 
 Eucamaragnathus
 Hiletus

Loricerinae 
 Loricera

Migadopinae
 Amarotypus
 Antarctonomus
 Aquilex
 Calathosoma
 Calyptogonia
 Decogmus
 Lissopterus
 Loxomerus
 Migadopidius
 Migadops
 Monolobus
 Nebriosoma
 Pseudomigadops
 Rhytidognathus
 Stichonotus
 Taenarthrus

Nebriinae
 Leistus
 Nebria
 Notiophilus
 Pelophila
 Nippononebria

Nototylinae

Omophroninae
 Omophron

Paussinae

Promecognathinae

Scaritinae 
 Clivina
 Dyschirius
 Scarites

Siagoninae

Carabidae Conjunctae

Amblytelinae

 Amblytelus

Apotominae

Brachininae

Broscinae

Dryptinae

Gineminae

Harpalinae

Lebiinae

Licininae

Melaeninae

Migadopinae

Orthogoniinae

Panagaeinae

Platyninae

Pseudomorphinae

Psydrinae

Pterostichinae

Trechinae

Miscellaneous genera 
 Amarotypus
 Migadopiella

References 

Lists of insect genera